High Point is an unincorporated community in southern Moniteau County, Missouri, United States. It is located ten miles south of California, approximately one mile west of Route 87 on Missouri Route C.

History
The first settlement at High Point was made in the 1830s. A post office called High Point was established in 1852, and remained in operation until 1973. The community was so named on account of its lofty elevation.

The High Point Historic District was listed on the National Register of Historic Places in 2005.

Notable people
 Louis F. Hart, seventh Lieutenant Governor, and ninth Governor, of the state of  Washington.
 Jack Tising, professional baseball player.

References

Unincorporated communities in Moniteau County, Missouri
Jefferson City metropolitan area
Unincorporated communities in Missouri